Narkanda is a town and a nagar panchayat in Kumarsain subdivision of Shimla district in the Indian state of Himachal Pradesh. It is at an elevation of 2708 meters on the Hindustan-Tibet Road (NH 5) in Himachal Pradesh, India within a fir (abies pindrow) forest. It is about 60 km away from Shimla and surrounded by the Himalayan Range. 

It is a skiing resort in winter. It connects Shimla with Kumarsain and Rampur and a detour also goes to Kotgarh-Thanedhar, the prime apple belt of Himachal Pradesh where Satyananda Stokes started the apple culture.

Geography
It has an average elevation of 2708 metres (8599 feet). The famous Hatu peak is 8 km from Narkanda. Kumarsain, which is 20 km from Narkanda, is the nearest town and Narkanda comes under Kumarsain subdivision and tehsil. Kotgarh is 15 km from Narkanda and known for apple orchards. Satyanand Stokes brought the apple to this place and helped strengthen the economy of this area. Today Rs 3,000 Crore direct and indirect income is generated through apple production. Presently apple growers are shifting to bring their farm under cherry cultivation to fetch fast money in their pocket as holdings are marginalised d noue to population factor. The grandson of Mr. Stokes is experimenting to develop new variety of apple for better production.

Climate 
This town experiences a pleasant weather throughout the year. During the summer time from April to June, the maximum temperature is around 20°C while the minimum temperature is 10°C. While the months of July to September, Narkanda experiences the monsoon season, the months of November till March are the months when this town is covered in the sheets of snow. The maximum temperature during this time are 7-8°C and can drop till - 5to-10°C during the nights .

Flora 
The area is dominated by a large temperate forest mostly consist of Conifer, Oak, Maple, Populus, Aesculus, Corylus, Holly species. Tree species include:

 Conifer: There are several species of conifers growing in the area which cover the substantial part of the forest. These include: Abies pindrow, Cedrus deodara, Cryptomeria japonica, Picea smithiana, Pinus wallichiana and Taxus contorta.
 Oak: Quercus semecarpifolia and Quercus floribunda are native to the area.
 Maple: Acer caesium and Acer acuminatum are native to the area.
 Poplar: Populus ciliata is native to the area.
 Aesculus: Aesculus indica is native to the area.
 Hazelnut: Corylus jacquemontii is native to the area.
 Holly: Ilex dipyrena is native to the area.

Apart from these trees, there are various species shrubs like Berberis aristata and flower plants growing in the area. Recently, the forest has been cleared for the apple orchards.

Demographics
 India census, Narkanda had a population of 2712. Males constitute 62% of the population and females 38%. Narkanda has an average literacy rate of 80%, higher than the national average of 59.5%: male literacy is 85%, and female literacy is 72%. In Narkanda, 15% of the population is under 6 years of age. The native language here is Pahari but Hindi and English are also spoken.

See also
Reo Purgyil

References

External links
 
 Official State Tourism website
 Every thing about Narkanda

Cities and towns in Shimla district
Ski areas and resorts in India
Hill stations in Himachal Pradesh